Oxycera albovittata is a species of soldier fly in the family Stratiomyidae.

Distribution
Canada.

References

Stratiomyidae
Insects described in 1917
Taxa named by John Russell Malloch
Diptera of North America